Ann Burbrook, sometimes credited as Annie Burbrook, (born 23 November 1965 in Jesselton, Sabah, Malaysia), is an Australian actress.

Early life 
Burbrook trained at the Australian Ballet School and the WA Academy of Performing Arts before dancing with a number of ballet companies in Australia.  In 1986 she moved to Brisbane to dance with the Queensland Ballet.

After her ballet career was cut short, she made the transition from dancing to acting through an association with La Boite Theatre in Brisbane. During her three-year association with that theatre she performed in a number of plays as well as becoming a Theatresports player, convener and tutor.  She also administered Theatresports in Queensland for three years before successfully auditioning for the National Institute of Dramatic Art (NIDA).

Burbrook graduated from Australia's National Institute of Dramatic Art (NIDA) with a degree in Performing Arts (Acting) in 1992 which she upgraded to a BA Arts in 1997 after successful completion of the NIDA Playwrights Course.

Career 
Despite a large number of theatre, film and television roles, Burbrook would be most recognised for her major role as Roz Patterson, on Blue Heelers  on which she appeared in 1994.

She continues to work as an actor and voice over artist whilst using her administrative skills in positions such as artistic coordinator, general manager and festival director for a number of arts organisations.

Filmography

References

External links
 

1965 births
Australian television actresses
Living people
Australian Ballet School alumni